The 2001 Swedish Rally (formally the 50th International Swedish Rally) was the second round of the 2001 World Rally Championship. The race was held over three days between 9 February and 11 February 2001, and was won by Peugeot's Harri Rovanperä, his first and only win in the World Rally Championship.

Background

Entry list

Itinerary
All dates and times are CET (UTC+1).

Results

Overall

World Rally Cars

Classification

Special stages

Championship standings

FIA Cup for Production Rally Drivers

Classification

Special stages

Championship standings

References

External links 
 Official website of the World Rally Championship

Sweden
Swedish Rally
Rally